Ulf Eriksson (born 21 February 1958) is a Swedish former professional footballer who played as a midfielder and made 34 appearances for the Sweden national team.

Career
Eriksson made his debut for Sweden on 17 November 1979 in a friendly match against Singapore, which finished as a 5–0 win. He went on to make 34 appearances, scoring 3 goals, before making his last appearance on 15 January 1988 in the 1–0 win Maspalomas tournament win against Finland.

Career statistics

International
Appearances and goals by national team and year

International goals

Honours 
Individual

 Nordic Football Championship top scorer: 1981–85 (shared with Frank Arnesen, Lars Bastrup, Preben Elkjær, Hannu Turunen, Ari Valvee, and Tom Lund)

References

External links
 
 
 

1958 births
Living people
Footballers from Uppsala
Swedish footballers
Sweden international footballers
Association football midfielders
Swedish expatriate footballers
Swedish expatriate sportspeople in Greece
Expatriate footballers in Greece
Enköpings SK players
Hammarby Fotboll players
Aris Thessaloniki F.C. players
Huddinge IF players
Allsvenskan players
Super League Greece players